Midnight Creeper is an album by jazz saxophonist Lou Donaldson recorded for the Blue Note label in 1968 and featuring Donaldson with Blue Mitchell, Lonnie Smith, George Benson, and Leo Morris.

Reception
The album was awarded 4 stars in an Allmusic review by Stephen Thomas Erlewine who states "As he delved deeper into commercial soul-jazz and jazz-funk, Lou Donaldson became better at it. While lacking the bite of his hard bop improvisations or the hard-swinging funk of Alligator Bogaloo, Midnight Creeper succeeds where its predecessor, Mr. Shing-A-Ling failed: it offers a thoroughly enjoyable set of grooving, funky soul-jazz... Donaldson could frequently sound stilted on his commercial soul-jazz dates, but that's not the case with Midnight Creeper. He rarely was quite as loose on his late-'60s/early-'70s records as he is here, and that's what makes Midnight Creeper a keeper".

Track listing 
 "Midnight Creeper" (Donaldson) - 6:32
 "Love Power" (Teddy Vann) - 7:46
 "Elizabeth" (Donaldson) - 5:37
 "Bag of Jewels" (Lonnie Smith) - 9:44
 "Dapper Dan" (Harold Ousley) - 6:30

Personnel 
 Lou Donaldson - alto saxophone
 Blue Mitchell - cornet
 Lonnie Smith - organ
 George Benson - guitar
 Idris Muhammad - drums

References 

Lou Donaldson albums
1968 albums
Albums produced by Francis Wolff
Blue Note Records albums
Albums recorded at Van Gelder Studio